Strajin Nedović (born 7 August 1976) is a Serbian professional basketball coach and former player who is the head coach for Zlatibor of the Basketball League of Serbia and the ABA League Second Division.

Playing career 
As a basketball player, Nedović almost played his entire career with Zlatibor. The only period out of Zlatibor was in the 1995–96 season when he played for Radnički Obrenovac. Nedović retired as a player with Zlatibor in 2011.

Coaching career 
Nedović joined the coaching staff of Zlatibor when he was an active player for the club. At first, he was a coach in their youth system. Later, he became an assistant coach. As the assistant coach, Nedović participated in the greatest successes of the club, such as the promotion to the Second League of Serbia in 2015, as well as the promotion to the Basketball League of Serbia (BLS) two years later. In BLS, he was an assistant to Vanja Guša for two seasons, starting in 2017.

In February 2019, Nedović became the head coach for Zlatibor after Guša parted ways with the club. In April 2022, Zlatibor won the ABA League Second Division for the 2021–22 season following a 78–73 overtime win over MZT Skopje Aerodreom.

Personal life 
Nedović was a party leader of the Democratic Party (DS) in Čajetina. He was a candidate at the 2008 Serbian local elections in Čajetina. In February 2014, he left the Democratic Party to join newly formed New Democratic Party (NDS) (later Social Democratic Party) led by former Serbian President Boris Tadić.

References

External links
 Coach Profile at eurobasket.com

1976 births
Living people
Democratic Party (Serbia) politicians
KK Radnički Obrenovac players
KK Zlatibor coaches
KK Zlatibor players
People from Čajetina
Serbian men's basketball coaches
Serbian men's basketball players
Social Democratic Party (Serbia) politicians
Sportspeople from Užice